Events from the year 1973 in North Korea.

Incumbents
Premier: Kim Il 
Supreme Leader: Kim Il-sung

Events
 North Korea disputed the Northern Limit Line.

See also
Years in Japan
Years in South Korea

References

 
North Korea
1970s in North Korea
Years of the 20th century in North Korea
North Korea